Ilona Maria Gusenbauer (née Majdan on 16 September 1947) is a retired Austrian high jumper. She competed at the 1968 and 1972 Olympics and finished in eighth and third place, respectively. She held the world record for more than a year starting in 1971, and was the Austrian champion in 1966–1973, 1975 and 1976.

References

1947 births
Living people
Austrian female high jumpers
Olympic bronze medalists for Austria
Athletes (track and field) at the 1968 Summer Olympics
Athletes (track and field) at the 1972 Summer Olympics
Olympic athletes of Austria
World record setters in athletics (track and field)
Place of birth missing (living people)
European Athletics Championships medalists
Medalists at the 1972 Summer Olympics
Olympic bronze medalists in athletics (track and field)
Universiade medalists in athletics (track and field)
Universiade bronze medalists for Austria
Medalists at the 1970 Summer Universiade